Junsele djurpark is a Swedish zoo in Junsele, Sollefteå kommun, in Sweden.

Junsele djurpark was started in small scale by the Sports club Junseles idrottsförening during the sixties.

The zoo was founded and opened in 1965. Junsele kommun bought the zoo in 1969, until it was sold in 1992. Since then the zoo is part of the company Äventyrsberget.

The zoo is specialized in carnivores and displays the rare white colored moose.

References
 Much of the content of this article comes from the equivalent Swedish-language wikipedia article.  Retrieved on 8 December 2014. Some of the following references are cited by that Swedish-language article:

Zoos in Sweden
Buildings and structures in Västernorrland County